Kopce may refer to the following places:
Kopce, Kuyavian-Pomeranian Voivodeship (north-central Poland)
Kopce, Lublin Voivodeship (east Poland)
Kopce, Podlaskie Voivodeship (north-east Poland)
Kopce, Masovian Voivodeship (east-central Poland)
Kopce, Greater Poland Voivodeship (west-central Poland)